Daniel Nsala Wakpal (born 15 March 1975) is a Ghanaian politician and member of the National Democratic Congress. He is the member of parliament for the Kpandai Constituency, in the Northern Region of Ghana.

Early life and education 
Wakpal hails from Saboba. He holds a Master of Arts in Local Government Administration and Organisation.

References 

Living people
People from Northern Ghana
Ghanaian MPs 2021–2025
National Democratic Congress (Ghana) politicians
1975 births